Émile Sartorius (11 September 1883 – 23 November 1933) was a French footballer. He competed in the men's tournament at the 1908 Summer Olympics. He played as a right winger.

References

External links
 

1883 births
1933 deaths
French footballers
France international footballers
Olympic footballers of France
Footballers at the 1908 Summer Olympics
Sportspeople from Roubaix
Association football forwards
RC Roubaix players
Footballers from Hauts-de-France